The 2018 season is Warriors' 23rd consecutive season in the top flight of Singapore football and in the S.League. Along with the S.League, the club will also compete in the Prime League, the Singapore Cup and the Singapore League Cup.

Squad

S.League squad

Coaching staff

Transfers

Pre-Season transfers

In

Out

Note 1: Gabriel Quak was initially signed to a deal but released after Navy FC wanted to sign him.

Note 2: Ridhuan Muhammad was released by Borneo FC after the Cup Competition, thus making him a free agent.

Note 3: Baihakki Khaizan moved to Muangthong United but was loaned to Udon Thani before the new season start.

Retained

Promoted

Trial

Mid-season transfers

Out

Friendly

Pre-Season Friendly

Team statistics

Appearances and goals

Competitions

Overview

Singapore Premier League

Singapore Cup

Warriors FC lost 5-2 on aggregate.

See also 
 2017 Warriors FC season

References 

Warriors FC
Warriors FC seasons